Jammulapalem is a village in Guntur district of the Indian state of Andhra Pradesh. It is located in Bapatla mandal of Tenali revenue division. The main occupation of the village is agriculture, for which the irrigation water is drawn from the Kommamuru and Poondla channels of Krishna Western Delta system.

Geography 

Governance 

Jammulapalem gram panchayat is the local self-government of the village. It is divided into wards and each ward is represented by a ward member.

Education 

As per the school information report for the academic year 2018–19, the village has only one MPP school.

See also 
List of villages in Guntur district

References 

Villages in Guntur district